Michael Ian Black (born Michael Ian Schwartz; August 12, 1971) is an American comedian, actor, writer, and director. He has starred in several TV comedy series, including The State, Viva Variety, Stella, Wet Hot American Summer: First Day of Camp, Michael & Michael Have Issues, and Another Period. In the late 1990s to early 2000s, he was the puppeteer and voice actor for the Pets.com sock puppet dog. He also appeared on Celebrity Poker Showdown several times. He released his first children's book, Chicken Cheeks, in 2009, and has since released six more, in addition to four books for adults.

Early life
Black was born in Chicago, Illinois, to Jill and Robert Schwartz, a store owner and an executive, respectively. His family is Jewish. He grew up in Hillsborough Township, New Jersey, where he attended Hillsborough High School. His parents divorced when he was three years old; his mother, Jill, later came out as a lesbian. Black's father died at age 39 due to a head injury apparently suffered in an assault and allergic reaction during subsequent surgery.

His birth name, Schwartz, is derived from the German word schwarz, which means black. He changed his name to Michael Ian Black to avoid confusion with the actor Mike Schwartz.

Black briefly attended New York University, but dropped out to portray Raphael in the promotional campaign for the Teenage Mutant Ninja Turtles concert tour.

Career

1991–2010
Black began his career as a member of the comedy group The State and was featured on the television show of the same name on MTV. He continued working with members of that group on the show Viva Variety in the role of "Johnny Bluejeans", and in the film Wet Hot American Summer, directed by frequent collaborator David Wain.

Black also appeared on VH1's I Love the... series, his comedy troupe Stella, and in various TV series and films. From 1998 to 2000, he was the puppeteer and  voice actor for the Pets.com sock puppet, was featured in commercials for Sierra Mist, hosted the first season of NBC's hidden-camera show Spy TV, made several appearances in the film Big Helium Dog, and had a supporting role on the NBC dramedy Ed, later becoming the mascot for BarNone. He would later describe his experience as the sock puppet as “painful but fun”.

His dry, sarcastically irreverent commentary on pop culture artifacts on VH1's I Love the '70s/'80s/'90s/New Millennium series added to his and the shows' popularity. Black stated several times on the show that he felt as if he was "doomed to an eternity" of doing the I Love the... series. He also made fun of himself for being a Jewish-American and sarcastically enforcing Jewish stereotypes.

Black is a poker enthusiast and appeared in five episodes of Celebrity Poker Showdown beginning in 2003, playing for the Endeavor House charity. In 2004 and 2006 he played for the charity MAZON: A Jewish Response to Hunger. In 2006, he came in third (receiving $100,000 for his charity). Black was praised for his humor and his skilled poker play by Dave Foley, host of Celebrity Poker Showdown, and by poker experts Phil Gordon and Phil Hellmuth.

In the latter part of 2004, he acted as guest host of CBS's The Late Late Show while auditioning for the permanent hosting role. He was a finalist for the position, but the job eventually went to Craig Ferguson. He is also an occasional contributor to the online edition of McSweeney's, where he writes a column titled "Michael Ian Black Is a Very Famous Celebrity".

Black, along with fellow State members Michael Showalter and David Wain, co-starred in and cowrote the Comedy Central series Stella, a television adaptation of their popular stage show. The ten-episode first season debuted in June 2005 and was not renewed for a second season.

Black wrote the screenplays for two feature film comedies —Wedding Daze (2006) and Run, Fat Boy, Run (2007, co-written with leading actor Simon Pegg). Black also directed Wedding Daze which stars Jason Biggs, Joe Pantoliano, and Isla Fisher.

Black also has some minor screen credits. He appeared twice on the Adult Swim show Tom Goes to the Mayor, was a guest voice on Seth Green's stop-motion show Robot Chicken, and later did a bit for Tim and Eric Awesome Show, Great Job!. He appeared on the Comedy Central shows Crank Yankers and Reno 911!. He had a cameo in David Wain's 2007 film The Ten as a prison guard. In September 2007, he released his first stand-up comedy album, I Am a Wonderful Man. In addition, he starred on the TV series Reaper as a gay demon trying to destroy the devil through acts of kindness. In 2008, Black published a book titled My Custom Van ... And 50 Other Mind-Blowing Essays That Will Blow Your Mind All Over Your Face. Also in 2008, he hosted Reality Bites Back, a scripted reality show on Comedy Central.

Black then developed another show for Comedy Central, Michael Ian Black Doesn't Understand. The concept was later retooled as Michael & Michael Have Issues; a pilot episode, featuring Michael Showalter, was shot in August 2008. Comedy Central confirmed in February 2009 that a seven-episode run of the show would air in July.

His first children's book, Chicken Cheeks, was published by Simon & Schuster Children's Publishing on January 6, 2009. The book is illustrated by Kevin Hawkes. In a starred review, Kirkus called the book "a perfect collaboration of text and illustration." An alternative review was aired on the Michael Showalter Showalter.

Black appeared in several Sierra Mist and Klondike commercials, as well as an eBay commercial with Showalter.

On February 21, 2009, Black instigated a "Celeb-Feud" — or as he called it, the "World's First Twitter War" — with LeVar Burton to see if he could muster more Twitter followers than Burton. Black dubbed the feud "LeWar."

2010–present
In 2010 Black started the podcast Mike and Tom Eat Snacks with his former Ed castmate Tom Cavanagh. Black and Meghan McCain cowrote the book America, You Sexy Bitch: A Love Letter to Freedom in June 2012. The two took a road trip across America during the summer of 2011, documenting how Americans were living.

In 2012, he starred as the host Bill Tundle in the web series Burning Love, a spoof of the TV series The Bachelor and The Bachelorette. He also co-hosted G4 TV with Candace Bailey that year. He has occasionally appeared as a guest on Red Eye with Greg Gutfeld. He stars in Adult Swim's late night infomercial parody, You're Whole, as Randall Tyree Mandersohn. After a guest appearance in the pilot, it was announced in 2013 that Black would join the FOX comedy Us & Them in a regular role.

In 2013, he and Michael Showalter launched the podcast Topics. Alongside Jason Ritter, Alexis Bledel, and Kerri Kenney-Silver, Black appeared in the unaired 2013 Fox sitcom Us & Them, a 13-episode US adaptation of the hit UK sitcom Gavin & Stacey, which was canceled while the seventh episode was in production. Fox decided to not air any of the episodes. Black played the role of Brian.

He co-hosted the single-season 2013 game show Trust Me, I'm a Game Show Host alongside D.L. Hughley. He was also a co-host on Duck Quacks Don't Echo, and one of the guest stars on the short-lived Steve Carell 2014 improv sketch show Riot.  On June 11, 2014, he appeared on Ken Reid's TV Guidance Counselor Podcast.

Black played Peepers, an uptight butler, on the Comedy Central series Another Period. He also played the role of Daniel on the TVLand series The Jim Gaffigan Show, as well as McKinley in the prequel to 2001's Wet Hot American Summer, titled Wet Hot American Summer: First Day of Camp.

Black hosts How to Be Amazing, an in-depth interview podcast show, produced by Black, Jennifer Brennan and Mary Shimkin. It is largely recorded at Argot Studios in New York City. In June 2017, Black recorded an episode in Los Angeles with pop star Katy Perry for her livestream marathon, Katy Perry Live: Witness World Wide.

Black appears in Smosh: The Movie as Steve YouTube, the fictional germophobic creator and CEO of YouTube. The movie premiered on July 24, 2015, at VidCon 2015 in Los Angeles.

In 2018, Black began hosting a new podcast titled Obscure with Michael Ian Black in which he reads works of classic literature and makes comments about the books as he reads. In Season 1 he reads Jude the Obscure by author Thomas Hardy. In Season 2 he reads Mary Shelley's Frankenstein. In Season 3 he reads Emily Brontë's Wuthering Heights.

In May 2020 Black returned to a rebooted Reno 911! in a new recurring role as Captain Schwartz, named for his birthname. Schwartz is the commander of a heavily militarized parody of Hatzalah, the Jewish volunteer medical emergency service.

Personal life
Black married Martha Anne Hagen in 1998. They have two children, Elijah (born 2001), and Ruthie (born 2003). They reside in Savannah, Georgia.

Black's parents were Jewish. He is an atheist.

Bibliography

Books 
 My Custom Van: And 50 Other Mind-Blowing Essays that Will Blow Your Mind All Over Your Face (2008)
 You're Not Doing It Right: Tales of Marriage, Sex, Death, and Other Humiliations (2012)
 America, You Sexy Bitch: A Love Letter to Freedom (with Meghan McCain; 2012)
 Navel Gazing: True Tales of Bodies, Mostly Mine (but also my mom's, which I know sounds weird) (2016)
 A Better Man: A (Mostly Serious) Letter to My Son (2020)

Children's books
 Chicken Cheeks (2009)
 The Purple Kangaroo (2009)
 A Pig Parade Is a Terrible Idea (2011)
 I'm Bored (2012)
 Naked! (2014)
 Cock-a-Doodle-Doo-Bop! (2015)
 A Child's First Book of Trump (2016) 
 I'm Sad (2018)
 I'm Sorry (2021)
 I'm Worried (2021)

Articles 
 
———————
Notes

Discography
 Comedy For Gracious Living by The State (recorded 1996, released 2010)
 I am a Wonderful Man (2007)
 Very Famous (2011)
 Noted Expert (2016)

Filmography

Film

Television

References

External links

 
 
 

1971 births
Living people
20th-century American comedians
21st-century American comedians
American male comedians
American male film actors
American male television actors
American male television writers
American podcasters
American sketch comedians
American stand-up comedians
American television writers
Comedians from New Jersey
Comedy film directors
Hillsborough High School (New Jersey) alumni
Jewish American atheists
Jewish American male actors
Jewish American male comedians
Jewish American writers
Male actors from Chicago
Male actors from New Jersey
The New Yorker people
People from Hillsborough Township, New Jersey
People from Redding, Connecticut
Screenwriters from Illinois
Tisch School of the Arts alumni
Writers from Chicago